The Mullets is an American sitcom created by Bill Oakley and Josh Weinstein. Starring Michael Weaver, David Hornsby, Loni Anderson and John O'Hurley, it aired on UPN from September 11, 2003 to March 17, 2004.

Premise
The Mullets are blue-collar, wrestling-loving, light-hearted, optimistic brothers who don the hairstyle that bears their surname ("business in the front, party in the back"). The brothers work as roofers, sport identical mullet haircuts, and have different personalities; Dwayne Mullet (Michael Weaver) has a loud, in-your-face demeanor, while Denny Mullet (David Hornsby) is a quieter, more thoughtful, easygoing guy. The brothers live life to the fullest while dreaming of bigger and better futures, though their fantasies are out of step with their reality.

Their mother, Mandi Mullet-Heidecker (Loni Anderson), is a warm, maternal type who couldn't be more proud of her offspring, no matter what they do. She's recently married to Roger Heidecker (John O'Hurley), a clean-cut game show host who is the polar opposite of her boys and her former life.

Cast
Michael Weaver as Dwayne Mullet
David Hornsby as Denny Mullet
Loni Anderson as Mandi Mullet-Heidecker
John O'Hurley as Roger Heidecker

Episodes
Eleven episodes were made, but only eight were broadcast.

External links
 
 

2000s American sitcoms
2003 American television series debuts
2004 American television series endings
English-language television shows
Television series by Warner Bros. Television Studios
UPN original programming
Television series created by Bill Oakley and Josh Weinstein
Television shows set in California